The Solar Submillimeter Telescope (SST) is a solar dedicated instrument with the aim to study the radiation produced by high-energy particles during solar flares.  Observing at 212 and 405 GHz with a focal array since 2001, it is a unique instrument that has produced a wealth of new information. Some of its discoveries are still unexplained by current theories. SST construction started in 1995, and it saw the first light in April 1999; since April 2001 it operates on a daily basis.  It is installed at Complejo Astronomico El Leoncito (San Juan Province, Argentina) under agreement between the Argentinian National Scientific and Technical Research Council (CONICET) and the Brazilian Universidade Presbiteriana Mackenzie.

References

Radio telescopes
Solar telescopes